Reloncaví Estuary (Spanish: Esturario de Reloncaví, archaic: Sin Fondo) is a fjord off Reloncaví Sound, located in the Los Lagos Region of Chile. Several National Parks and Wilderness Areas are situated in the vicinity of this fjord. Among them are: Alerce Andino National Park, Hornopirén National Park, Vicente Pérez Rosales National Park, Llanquihue National Reserve and the Cochamó Valley. The Yate Volcano towers above this fjord. The Puelo River empties into this estuary. It also receives the outflow of the Todos los Santos Lake through the short tortuous Petrohué River.

Sources

Fjords of Chile
Bodies of water of Los Lagos Region
Coasts of Los Lagos Region